USS PCS-1405 was a United States Navy minesweeper in commission from 1944 to 1946. She saw service in the latter stages of World War II.

After her Navy service, she was transferred to the United States Coast and Geodetic Survey, where she saw service as the coastal survey ship USC&GS Bowie (CSS 27) from 1946 to 1967.

Construction and commissioning
The ship was laid down as PC-1405 on 1 May 1943 by the Greenport Basin and Construction Company in Greenport, New York. Reclassified as a "patrol craft sweeper" (PCS) in April 1943 and redesignated PCS-1405, she was launched on 21 August 1943 and commissioned as USS PCS-1405 on 1 February 1944.

United States Navy service

PCS-1450 made a shakedown cruise in the Caribbean Sea, then operated between southern Florida, and Guantanamo Bay, Cuba, as a patrol and escort ship until June 1945. She then was transferred to Pearl Harbor, Hawaii, where she served until February 1946 before returning to the United States.

After undergoing conversion into a survey ship, PCS-1405 was decommissioned in August 1946 and transferred to the United States Coast and Geodetic Survey the same month. She was stricken from the Naval Vessel Register in February 1947.

United States Coast and Geodetic Survey service

The U.S. Coast and Geodetic Survey commissioned the vessel on 3 October 1946 as the coastal survey ship USC&GS Bowie (CSS 27). Bowie served on hydrographic survey duties along the United States West Coast and in Alaska until 1 February 1967, when she was decommissioned. She was sold in 1967.

Fate
Bowie'''s later fate is unclear. She was photographed as recently as 2003 as MV Bowie'' in Slatery Bay near Powell River, British Columbia, Canada. As of at least 2005, an effort was underway to preserve her as an historic ship, billing her as the last surviving PCS-type ship.

References

External links 
 Photo gallery of USS PC-1405, USC&GS Bowie (CSS 27), and MV Bowie
 aquantri.com Photos of MV Bowie at restoration Web site

PCS-1376-class minesweepers
Ships built in Greenport, New York
1943 ships
World War II minesweepers of the United States
Ships of the United States Coast and Geodetic Survey
Ships transferred from the United States Navy to the United States Coast and Geodetic Survey